Darvaleh may refer to:
 Darvaleh-ye Bala
 Darvaleh-ye Pain